William Bean (1787–1866)  was an English geologist and conchologist. He was a pioneer of Yorkshire geology. In 1859, he sold his collection of over 15,000 fossils (mostly from localities around Scarborough). The majority of his collection was purchased by the British Museum and the Yorkshire Philosophical Society.

Bean described several new species of Mollusca, including the whelk Beringius turtoni, named in honor of William Turton. Bean was associated with the Magazine of Natural History, and was a friend of Joshua Alder and Albany Hancock.

References
 Ian Massey, 1978 The William Bean shell collection -Wood End Museum of Natural History, Scarborough Porcupine Newsletter Vol 1 No.6

English palaeontologists
1787 births
1866 deaths
19th-century British geologists